Elasis is a genus of monocotyledonous flowering plants in the dayflower family, first described as a genus in 1978. The genus consists of a single species, Elasis hirsuta endemic to Ecuador.

References

Commelinaceae
Monotypic Commelinales genera
Endemic flora of Ecuador